Regional Express may refer to:

 Regional-Express, a train operator in Austria, Germany & Luxembourg
 Rex Airlines, formerly Regional Express Airlines, an airline in Australia
 GO Transit Regional Express Rail, an ongoing transit improvement project in Greater Toronto
 Transport express régional, a train category and brand name in France